Weston County School District #7 is a public school district based in Upton, Wyoming, United States.

Geography
Weston County School District #7 serves the northwestern portion of Weston County. The town of Upton is the only incorporated place in the district.

Schools
Upton High School (Grades 9–12)
Upton Middle School (Grades 6–8)
Upton Elementary School (Grades K-5)

Student demographics
The following figures are as of October 1, 2019.

Total District Enrollment: 235
Student enrollment by gender
Male: 126 (53.62%)
Female: 109 (46.38%)
Student enrollment by ethnicity
White (not Hispanic): 216 (91.91%)
Hispanic: 6 (2.55%)
American Indian or Alaskan Native: 0 (0.00%)
Black (not Hispanic): 1 (0.43%)

See also
List of school districts in Wyoming

References

External links
Weston County School District #7 – official site.

Education in Weston County, Wyoming
School districts in Wyoming